Qishan (18 January 1786 – 3 August 1854), courtesy name Jing'an, was a Mongol nobleman and official of the late Qing dynasty. He was of Khalkha Mongol and Borjigit descent, and his family was under the Plain Yellow Banner of the Manchu Eight Banners. He is best known for negotiating the Convention of Chuanbi on behalf of the Qing government with the British during the First Opium War of 1839–42.

Life
Qishan was a Khalkha Mongol by birth and was from the Borjigit clan. His 7th generator ancestor Enggeder had led his followers to submit to the Qing Empire and received a hereditary first class marquis peerage in return. Qishan inherited the peerage from his ancestor. His father, Chengde, served as a general in Hangzhou and dutong (都統; a military commander) in Rehe Province.

In 1806, Qishan obtained the position of a yinsheng (蔭生; or shengyuan 生員) in the entry-level imperial examination and was recruited into the civil service as a yuanwailang (員外郎; assistant director) in the Ministry of Justice. In 1819, he was promoted to xunfu (provincial governor) of Henan Province but was later demoted to zhushi and put in charge of river works. Since then, he served in a number of appointments, including Viceroy of Liangjiang (1825–1827), Sichuan (1829–1831) and Zhili (1831–1840), and Grand Scholar of Wenyuan Cabinet.

In 1840, during the First Opium War, the Daoguang Emperor ordered Qishan to replace Lin Zexu as the acting Viceroy of Liangguang (covering Guangdong and Guangxi provinces). Qishan was also tasked with negotiating peace with the British. Upon witnessing British naval power, he ordered his troops to evacuate from the artillery batteries and sent Bao Peng to meet the British at Chuanbi (穿鼻; present-day Humen, Guangdong Province) and call for a peace settlement. 

On 20 January 1841, without seeking approval from the Qing imperial court, Qishan agreed to the Convention of Chuanbi with the British. Among other things, the convention required the Qing Empire to pay the British an indemnity of six million silver coins and cede Hong Kong Island. The Daoguang Emperor was furious when he found out later that Qishan had agreed to the convention without his permission. He ordered Qishan to be arrested and escorted as a criminal to Beijing for trial. Qishan had his properties and assets confiscated and was sentenced to military service.

Qishan was pardoned later and reinstated as an official in 1842. He was subsequently appointed as Imperial Resident in Tibet (1843–1847), a second term as Viceroy of Sichuan (1846–1849), and Viceroy of Shaan-Gan (1849–1851).

In 1852, during the reign of the Xianfeng Emperor, Qishan was appointed as an Imperial Commissioner to oversee Qing imperial forces in suppressing the Taiping Rebellion. He set up the "Jiangbei Camp" on the northern bank of the Yangtze River at Yangzhou, with 18,000 troops stationed there. He died in the autumn of 1854 in camp. The Qing government granted him the posthumous name "Wenqin".

Notes 
Footnotes

Citations

References
 
 

|-

|-

|-

|-

|-

|-

1786 births
1864 deaths
Chinese people of Mongolian descent
People of the First Opium War
Political office-holders in Guangdong
Political office-holders in Jiangsu
Political office-holders in Tianjin
Qing dynasty politicians from Beijing
Grand Secretaries of the Qing dynasty
Assistant Grand Secretaries
Viceroys of Liangguang
Viceroys of Liangjiang
Viceroys of Shaan-Gan
Viceroys of Sichuan
Viceroys of Zhili